Radio 8 is a Bosnian commercial radio station, broadcasting from Sarajevo, Bosnia and Herzegovina.

Radio 8 focuses on urban music, entertainment shows and local news. 
The program is currently broadcast at one frequency (Sarajevo ), estimated number of potential listeners is around 443,685.

Frequencies

 Sarajevo

See also 
List of radio stations in Bosnia and Herzegovina

References

External links 
 
 Communications Regulatory Agency of Bosnia and Herzegovina
 Radio 8 in Facebook

Sarajevo
Mass media in Sarajevo